Jacopo Fortunato (born 31 January 1990) is an Italian footballer who plays as a midfielder for San Donà.

Career

Internazionale
Fortunato joined Lombard club Internazionale along with Riccardo Bocalon in January 2008 from Veneto club Treviso for a total of €900,000 in co-ownership deals. In June 2008, Inter bought the remain 50% registration rights of both players for a total of €900,000.

With the reserve team of Inter — the Primavera team, Fortunato usually played as a central midfielder in 442 formation, or one of the 3 midfielders in 433 formation. He also played twice for Inter first team in friendlies, both at the international break which the team fielded with players without international duty and Primavera team players in the friendlies .

In July 2010, he was signed by Lega Pro Prima Divisione club Como from Inter along with Paolo Tornaghi and Simone Fautario. He played every match from round 1 to 10, and scored 2 goals in his debut match, a 3-1 win in the 2010–11 Coppa Italia. Fortunato played various position in the midfield, as central midfielder in 433 formation, an attacking midfielder in 4231/4312 formation, a left midfielder in 433 formation or a right midfielder in 343 formation. He was injured in mid-season and missed the rest of season.

On 31 August 2011 Fortunato was loaned to SPAL.

Lega Pro
On 1 July 2012 Fortunato became a free agent after  years with Inter. Inter got nothing from its €900,000 investment. On 24 July 2012 Fortunato was re-signed by Treviso (now run as new company FC Treviso srl) The club folded again in 2013 after finished last in the third division. On 5 July 2013 Fortunato joined Lega Pro Seconda Divisione club Mantova F.C. On 15 January 2015 Fortunato was signed by Pordenone in a 6-month contract.

In July 2018, he moved to Pineto in the Serie D.

Seregno
Ahead of the 2019/20 season, Fortunato joined U.S.D. 1913 Seregno Calcio.

Trento
On 5 December 2019, Trento announced the signing of Fortunato.

San Donà
In 2020, Fortunato moved to San Donà, where he became team captain.

Honours
Inter Primavera
Campionato Nazionale Primavera Runner-up: 2008

References

External links
 FIGC 
 Football.it Profile 
 

Italian footballers
Treviso F.B.C. 1993 players
Inter Milan players
Como 1907 players
Mantova 1911 players
Pordenone Calcio players
S.P.A.L. players
Reggina 1914 players
U.S. 1913 Seregno Calcio players
Serie C players
Serie D players
Association football midfielders
Footballers from Bergamo
1990 births
Living people